Nepalese in the United Kingdom (also British Nepalese, Nepalese British, British Nepali) are British citizens or full-time residents of the United Kingdom whose ethnic origins lie fully or partially in Nepal. According to ONS estimates in 2019 there were 76,000 Nepalese-born people in the country.

History

From the first quarter of the 19th century, Gurkhas from Nepal served in the British Army, and Gurkha soldiers' families lived in the UK. People from Nepal living in the UK belong to many different Nepalese ethnic groups or castes and may have different languages although all speak Nepali as a mother tongue.

In 1965, the first settlement of London's Nepalese community was made at 145 Whitfield Street in Camden. A commemorative plaque now stands on the site.

Demographics
The 2001 UK Census recorded 5,943 Nepali-born people were residing in the UK. In 2008, the president of the Himalayan Yeti Nepalese Association was reporting as estimating that up to 50,000 Nepalese might be living in the UK. The 2011 UK Census recorded 48,497 people born in Nepal living in England, 1,011 in Wales, 1,268 in Scotland and 105 in Northern Ireland. Office for National Statistics estimates suggest that 62,000 Nepalese-born people were resident in the UK in 2016.

At the time of the 2011 census, the regions with the largest Nepalese-born populations were London and South East England, with 19,051 and 19,111 people respectively. In particular there are significant communities in Aldershot and Folkestone due to links with the British Army. Of the 49,508 Nepalese-born in England and Wales, 56 per cent stated that they were Hindus, 25.9 per cent Buddhists and 3.8 per cent Christians. 1.7 per cent stated that they did not have a religion and a small number specified other religions. 11.8 per cent did not provide an answer to the religion question. 52.9 per cent of the Nepalese-born population of England and Wales had arrived during the period 2007 to 2011, 34.6 per cent between 2001 and 2006, 11.4 per cent between 1981 and 2000, and 1.1 per cent prior to 1981.

The London borough with the highest Nepalese born residents was Greenwich with 4,853 people.

Employment
, 3,430 Gurkhas were serving in the British Army. According to the 2001 UK census, 34.8 per cent of Nepalese-born people in London were working in hotels or restaurants, 15.7 per cent in real estate and renting, 15.3 per cent in wholesale and retail, 9.6 per cent in health and social care.

Notable individuals
Lachhiman Gurung
Dipprasad Pun
Tul Bahadur Pun
Amita Suman
Nirmal Purja
Santosh Shah
Yama Buddha
Rambahadur Limbu
Kulbir Thapa

See also
 List of Nepal-related topics

References

External links
http://www.chumlung.org

http://www.nepalisamajuk.com
http://www.ppguk.org
http://www.kryuk.org
http://www.tamudhee.org/
http://uknfs.org/
http://www.bgna.org.uk/

Asian diaspora in the United Kingdom
 
Immigration to the United Kingdom by country of origin
Office for National Statistics